A megalopolis is an extensive metropolitan area or a long chain of continuous metropolitan areas 

Megalopolis (Greek for large city, great city) may also refer to:

Related concepts
 Megacity
 Urban agglomeration
 Ecumenopolis

Places
 Megalopolis, Greece, now known as Megalópoli
 Megalopolis, modern Latin name for the Mecklenburg region, Germany
 Aphrodisias, a small city in Caria, Asia Minor, previously named Megale Polis
 Sivas, Turkey

Other
 Doomed Megalopolis, an anime rendition of the Japanese literary epic Teito Monogatari
 Megalopolis (film), the name of a film project by Francis Ford Coppola

See also
 Metropolis